Palliohedyle sutteri is a species of gastropods belonging to the family Acochlidiidae.

The species inhabits freshwater environments.

References

Acochlidiidae